Crescent Island or Ngo Mei Chau is an island of Hong Kong, located southeast of Crooked Island (Kat O) and northeast of Double Island (Wong Wan Chau). Administratively, it is part of North District.

Conservation
Crescent Island has been part of the Plover Cove (Extension) Country Park since 1979.

See also

 Double Haven
 Mirs Bay
 Beaches of Hong Kong

References

Islands of Hong Kong
North District, Hong Kong
Hong Kong UNESCO Global Geopark
Uninhabited islands of Hong Kong